The AFL Women's Rising Star award is presented annually to the best young player in the AFL Women's (AFLW) during the home-and-away season. The first award was awarded in 2017. The award has been sponsored by National Australia Bank (NAB) since 2017.

Eligibility and voting procedure
Every round, two nominations are given to standout young players who performed well during that particular round. To be eligible for nomination, a player must be under 21 years of age on 1 January of that year and not have been previously nominated. Players suspended during the season may be nominated, but cannot win. At the end of the season, each member of a voting panel, which also selects the AFL Women's All-Australian team, awards five votes, four votes, three votes, two votes and one vote to the nominated players they judge the best to fifth-best during the season respectively. The player with the highest total of votes wins.

Winners

Nominations

Nominations by club

Updated to the end of round 10, S7 (2022).

Most nominations in a season

Achievements of winners

See also

AFL Rising Star

References

External links
 AFLW Awards

!Rising Star
Awards established in 2017
2017 establishments in Australia
Rising Star
Rookie player awards